Brevundimonas mediterranea is a Gram-negative, rod-shaped and non-spore-forming  bacterium from the genus of Brevundimonas which has been isolated from seawater from the Mediterranean Sea in France.

References

Bacteria described in 2005
Caulobacterales